Plectonemertidae is a family of worms belonging to the order Monostilifera.

Genera:
 Argononemertes Moore & Gibson, 1981
 Plectonemertes Gibson, 1990
 Potamonemertes Moore & Gibson, 1973

References

Monostilifera
Nemertea families